Gerardo Martínez may refer to: 

 Gerardo Martínez (athlete) (born 1979), Mexican high jumper
 Gerardo Martínez (footballer) (born 1991), Argentine footballer
 Gerardo Martínez (tennis) (born 1969), Mexican tennis player